At the closing date of the receipt of applications to host 2006 Winter Olympics (formally known as XX Olympic Winter Games) on February 1, 1998, six cities had formally presented their candidatures to the IOC. The deadline for the receipt of candidature files was set at September 1, 1998. The Evaluation Commission proceeded with its visits to the six candidate cities in October and November 1998.

In the wake of the 2002 bidding controversy, a new bidding procedure was instituted in 1999 to elect the 2006 Winter Olympics host city. After the six candidates cities made their final presentations before the members of the International Olympic Committee, during its 108th Session in Seoul, a new body called "Selection College" was tasked with selecting two "finalist cities" that would be subjected to the members' voting, in order to determine the host city.

Turin's bid ended up defeating Sion by 53 votes to 36. The other four non-shortlisted candidate cities that made presentations to the IOC were Helsinki, Klagenfurt, Poprad-Tatry and Zakopane.

The selection of Turin over Sion came as a surprise, since Sion was the overwhelming favorite in part because the IOC is based in Switzerland.

Final selection

Bidding cities

References

Bids
 
1999 in South Korea
June 1999 events in Asia
Events in Seoul
1990s in Seoul